Veze may refer to:

Vèze, Cantal, commune in south-central France(!*
La Vèze, commune in eastern France
Vèze (bagpipe), played in Poitou